Edmar de Souza Arruda (born 26 September 1959) is a Brazilian politician and economist. He has spent his political career representing Paraná, having served as mayor of Maringá from 2001 to 2004 and as federal deputy representative from 2011 to 2019.

Personal life
Arruda is the son of Antonio Arruda de Souza and Alice da Silva de Souza. He is married to Silvana Pazzetto and is a member of the Independent Presbyterian Church of Brazil.

At the age of 15 Arruda moved to Maringá to work and study. He graduated with a degree in economics from the State University of Maringá, as well as having a degree in business management from Fundação Getúlio Vargas. Prior to becoming a politician, Arruda worked as an economists.

Political career
Arruda was elected to the federal chamber of deputies under banner of the Social Christian Party (Brazil) in the 2010 Brazilian general elections. In 2016 he joined the Social Democratic Party.

Arruda did not vote in the impeachment motion of then-president Dilma Rousseff. Arruda voted in favor of tax reform spending and the 2017 Brazilian labor reform, and voted against opening a corruption investigation against Rousseff's successor Michel Temer.

References

1959 births
Living people
People from Paraná (state)
Brazilian Presbyterians
Social Christian Party (Brazil) politicians
Social Democratic Party (Brazil, 2011) politicians
Members of the Chamber of Deputies (Brazil) from Paraná
Mayors of places in Brazil
Brazilian economists
Fundação Getulio Vargas alumni